Barachevo is a rural locality (a village) in Semyonkovskoye Rural Settlement, Vologodsky District, Vologda Oblast, Russia. The population was 26 as of 2002.

Geography 
Barachevo is located 9 km northwest of Vologda (the district's administrative centre) by road. Semyonkovo is the nearest rural locality.

References 

Rural localities in Vologodsky District